The K9 Thunder is a South Korean 155 mm self-propelled howitzer designed and developed by the Agency for Defense Development and civil contractors including Dongmyeong Heavy Industries, Kia Heavy Industry, Poongsan Corporation, and Samsung Aerospace Industries for the Republic of Korea Armed Forces, and is now manufactured by Hanwha Defense. K9 howitzers operate in groups with the K10 automatic ammunition resupply vehicle variant.

The entire K9 fleet operated by the ROK Armed Forces is now undergoing upgrades to K9A1, and a further upgrade variant K9A2 is being tested for production. As of 2022, the K9 series has had a 52% share of the global self-propelled howitzer market, including wheeled vehicles, since the year 2000.

Development

In the 1980s, the ROK Armed Forces came in need of a new artillery system to contest North Korean equipment. The armed forces operated M107 self-propelled guns and K55 self-propelled howitzers. However, they had shorter firing ranges compared to M-1978 Koksan and were outnumbered by various North Korean artillery. With the success in designing and manufacturing the KH178 105 mm and KH179 155 mm Towed Howitzers, and experience gained by license producing the K55 (KM109A2), the Ministry of Defense ordered the development of a new system that would have a longer firing range, faster firing rate, and high mobility. The development started in 1989 and was led by the Agency for Defense Development (ADD) and Samsung Aerospace Industries (now Hanwha Defense).

Since 1983, the ADD researchers have been collecting and analyzing data for future artillery. They saw that burst fire and quick relocation would become the dominant factor in artillery battles and built an automatic loading system for testing in 1984. In 1987, the ADD offered an upgrade plan to the existing K55 inspired by the United States' M109 Howitzer Improvement Program (HIP), but was rejected by the Republic of Korea Army in 1988. As a result, and at the beginning of K9 development, the ADD was determined to create a new weapon system and worked on a conceptual model until 1991. Early concepts requested by the military included river crossing capability and the installation of M61 Vulcan as an anti-air weapon, which were later removed due to being unnecessary for such a long-range weapon.

In 1989, the only design data the researchers could obtain at that time were the provisions of the four-nation ballistic agreements, namely the United States, the United Kingdom, Germany, and Italy, to secure the homogeneity of the ammunitions—the new 52 caliber gun fires a NATO standard ammunition (L15A1) at a speed of 945 m per second from chamber volume of 3,556 cm3. The first domestic design was prepared by extending and modifying the 155 mm 39 caliber gun used for the KH179. The first firing test was held in January 1992 but experienced many problems due to design errors.

In September 1990, a Korean developer visited the United Kingdom in search of turret design technology which was known to have been developed by British Vickers for AS-90. Vickers refused the technology transfer. Instead, the company offered the AS-90 for sale. The developer also visited Marconi, but the negotiations ended with an unsatisfactory result due to a high requested price. Therefore, developers pursued a domestic electrohydraulic driving system, using the experience in turret design and turret driving devices of the K1 MBT. The simulator was built in 1991.

The next year, researchers found that the disproportionate moment of the 52-caliber was twice of the K55. The balancing machine, which increased the capacity of the existing hydraulic balancing machine, did not sufficiently compensate for the imbalance moment value due to the change in the position of the armament. The driving force was very different depending on the driving angle. The same problem appeared in Germany's Panzerhaubitze 2000, which was under development. A joint research team from the ADD and Seoul National University of Science and Technology calculated an accurate theoretical model, and concluded that adjustment to system configuration was possible without major design changes.

Meanwhile, loud noise from hydraulic generators, which can cause hearing loss under long exposure, was also a problem. The engineers of the ADD and Dongmyeong Heavy Industries (now Mottrol) found that the noise was due to excessive shaking of hydraulic pressure, thus creating an experimental device using the principle of Helmholtz attenuators used in car mufflers. The noisy equipment became quieter and the hydraulic pulsation was significantly reduced. Overall, the domestic design showed driving precision of less than 1 mil in the standard error range.

In the winter of 1991, the ADD held talks with engineers from Samsung Aerospace Industries' special research institute. The ADD originally demanded that Samsung be in charge of system assembly only, as the company had no experience in developing its own tracked vehicle design despite having the experience in manufacturing K55 under license. The decision was overturned and the manufacture of the MTR (Mobility Test Rig) was decided upon. Samsung worked with KAIST on suspension and Seoul National University & Pohang University of Science and Technology on mobility systems. The engine was co-developed with American AAI Corporation. The test of the MTR was finished in November 1992.

In April 1992, BMY Combat Systems (now BAE Systems Land and Armaments) invited members of the ADD for its first M109A6 Paladin release ceremony and expressed interest in participating in Korea's self-propelled howitzer program by upgrading the K55 to Paladin standard. In May, members of BMY Combat Systems and Taledyne Brown visited the ADD, and suggested co-development of a new howitzer based on the P-52, a 52-caliber Paladin variant. This proposal was rejected by Korean developers. Later, during a Data Exchange Agreement meeting, South Korea and the United States confirmed that the U.S. had no claim to any intellectual property rights of the howitzer, to avoid possible disputes in the future.

An internal review predicted that the howitzer would achieve a localization rate of 107 out of 235 (45.5%) technologies by the late 1990s. Unsatisfied with the review, South Korea decided to continue developing its domestic main system, main gun, 155 mm ammunition, fire control system, structure, and autoloader. The engine, transmission, and INS (inertial navigation system) were chosen to be imported from foreign partners, and license produced hydropneumatic suspension to boost up localization by 70%. The engineers faced the biggest challenges designing main gun and suspension due to lack of experience. While licensing the K55, its main gun was brought as a finished product and the suspension was produced from knowledge from the United States.

Based on a review of the required operational capability in October 1992, a firing rate of three shots within 15 seconds was chosen for economic feasibility. The rationale was that it is difficult for targets to be out of fatal range within 15 seconds after the first impact, and that the firing rate can be shortened depending on training level. If a firing rate of three shots in 10 seconds was demanded, it would have caused a huge increase in development costs as well as an unnecessary burden on researchers.

The development was delayed between March to August 1993 as a result of purge of Hanahoe, a private military club within the Republic of Korea Armed Forces, who aligned with military dictator Chun Doo-hwan, by president Kim Young-sam who was elected by democratic election. Also, the army logistics department refused to sign the letter of agreement for XK9 until a development plan for the maintenance elements was made. When the Joint Chiefs of Staff finalized the system development agreement in late August 1993, the Defense Ministry approved a prototype development plan in September and the president approved the project in early October.

Since domestically developed armor steel plates were applied for the first time, the researchers decided to produce and compare armor plates from both imported and domestic materials to reduce the risk. Meantime, Samsung began to train and employ master craftsman welders whose skills were verified by the U.S. Aberdeen Test Center. Armor plates went through a series of tests such as stress and ballistic impacts, and researchers verified that the domestic plate performed better than the imported plate.

The ADD saw that the HSU (Hydropneumatic Suspension Unit) provides better mobility and crew comfort. At that time, the HSU caused problems with some equipment and it was yet to be fully verified for durability, igniting controversy internationally. Therefore, it was inevitable to introduce and localize a British Air-Log (now Horstman) HSU that is used for the AS-90. However, when researchers applied the Air-Log HSU on the MTR and prototypes, they soon found that the HSU couldn't support heavier vehicles, thus failing the durability test. Since May 1997, engineers from the ADD and Dongmyeong Heavy Industries have spent a year on five redesigns and 11 durability tests. After the development of the new HSU, the design was exported back to Britain.

Developers changed the power pack for the MTR with the combination of an 850 hp engine from Detroit Diesel, which offered a smaller cooling system, and Allison Transmission's X1100 automatic transmission. This powertrain passed the tests on the MTR, but the engine failed on prototype vehicles due to low durability. The researchers looked for new engines from overseas. Perkins Engines and MTU Friedrichshafen showed interest in selling engines in August 1995. Perkins Engines offered the CV12 Condor, which was also used in the Challenger 2, but with horsepower reduced to 1,000. The price was slightly higher than that of Detroit Diesel; it was a relatively large 12-cylinder, which would require a design change on the chassis and there was a technical insufficiency of cooling devices. MTU's MT-881, though more expensive, offered a compact eight-cylinder with the same cutting-edge cooling system from the latest Euro Pack. The engine was also used for the PzH 2000 in Germany, and was undergoing trials in Germany and Canada. After examinations, the German design was chosen for the program, and was tested on an ATR (Automotive Test Rig) for a year starting in September 1997.

In the spring of 1992, the test gun experienced a detonator breakage caused by a differential pressure, at which the pressure increases in the opposite direction of the shell. After many years of failures and updates, researchers decided to change the shape of the propellant in 1997. The tiny pellets of the U.S.-style propellant, which have seven holes similar to briquettes, were replaced with 19 holes by mimicking the German style without knowing the specification.

A total of three prototypes were built and performed their first open trials in 1996. In December 1997, one of the prototypes was damaged by fire, due to failing complete combustion, after testing 18 rounds in three minutes. One researcher was killed and two injured. The damaged prototype's internal system survived the fire, and was repaired for further use. The prototypes fired 4,100 rounds and underwent  of mobility tests including extreme temperature conditions and various type of terrain such as ski courses during the winter season.

After firing 12,000 rounds and driving  over 10 years, the development was finished in October 1998 with the achievement of an 87% localization rate. The contract for the first batch of K9 artillery system was awarded to Samsung Aerospace Industries in December 1998. The produced vehicles were supposed to be delivered to the Republic of Korea Army. However, a 1999 naval battle between the two Koreas caused the delivery to be rerouted to the Republic of Korea Marine Corps. The first vehicle was rolled out in December 1999, and was given to the marines in Yeonpyeongdo.

General characteristics
The K9 is of welded construction, using  of MIL-12560H armor steel developed by POSCO for K2 Black Panther project, which can withstand explosion pressure and fragments from 155 mm HE rounds, 14.5 mm armor piercing rounds, and anti-personnel mines all around. The vehicle can protect crews from CBRN threats using an air-purification system.

The power-pack consists of a  MT881Ka-500 MTU Friedrichshafen engine licensed by Ssangyong Heavy Industries (now STX Engine) and an Allison Transmission X1100-5A3 transmission licensed by Tongil Precision Machinery Industries (now SNT Dynamics), and is installed on a hydropneumatic suspension chassis. It can also be deployed as self-propelled coastal artillery for surface targets, creating a no-access zone within  its firing range.

Or  with K315 rounds fired from the upgraded K9A1 variant. The K9 stores 24 rounds in the bustle rack while an additional 24 rounds are located at the rear of the hull. Assisted by a semi-automatic feeding system, fire control system, and the Battalion Tactical Command System (BTCS), the vehicle can burst fire three rounds in 15 seconds, with the ability to land shells in multiple rounds simultaneous impact (MRSI) mode. It has a maximum rate of fire of six to eight rpm for three minutes (or until emptying 24 ammunitions store in the bustle rack), then reduced to two to three rpm for sustain fire. The vehicle can shoot-and-scoot and be ready to fire in 30 seconds when stationary or one minute if moving. After firing, it can relocate to a new position in 30 seconds, to increase survivability from enemy counter-battery attacks.

The shells, fed by from a K10 ammunition-resupply vehicle, enter from the door behind the turret and are automatically rolled and loaded on the rack. When the shooting specification is decided, the chosen shell is placed on the tray in the center of the rack. A loader pulls the tray handle, and the shell slides into the carrier. Then the carrier repositions to the angle of shooting, and transfers the shell to the autoloader, which immediately "throws" the shell into the barrel.

The K9 uses the TALIN (Tactical Advanced Land Inertial Navigator) 5000 for its INS, purchased from Honeywell Aerospace after the announcement of the development of a ring laser gyroscope system that can withstand the shock from gunfire. The positioning device consists of a ring laser gyro that can detect up to one-ten-thousandth of Earth's rotational angular velocity, an accelerometer that can detect up to one-hundred-thousandth of Earth's gravitational acceleration, and a navigation computer that calculates using data detected by these sensors. This positioning device calculates the location of the self-propelled gun, the azimuth angle of the gun to the north, and the elevation and inclination angle of the earth's horizontal plane by itself. The calculated navigation information and posture information are provided to the fire control system, which has a positional accuracy within 10 m, an azimuthal accuracy within 0.7 mil, and an elevation and inclination angle accuracy within 0.35 mil.

The K9 has both manual (mechanical and optical) and automatic (electronic) fire control system. The manual fire control system is similar to that of K55, while the AFCS consists largely of a system controller, display, a shooting controller with a built-in ballistic program, a communication processor, and a power controller, and serves as an interface between the operator and the machine. Various electronic control devices such as positioning devices, gun & turret driving systems, ammunition transports, trigger devices, gun temperature sensors, and radios are interlinked to achieve automation. The AFCS uses ballistic programs and muzzle velocity sensors to calculate firing data on its own, as well as to receive shooting commands via data and voice communication from the BTCS. The FCS is the first of its kind in that it can calculate weather measurements by altitude, thus providing more precise shooting specifications.

K10 ARV (Ammunition Resupply Vehicle)

The K10 ARV is an automatic resupply vehicle based on K9 platform, sharing most of the components and characteristics. Its concept study started in November 1998 by Samsung Aerospace Industries and Pusan National University. Its design began in February 2002 by Samsung Techwin (previously Samsung Aerospace Industries), the ADD, and the DTaQ (Defense Agency for Technology and Quality), The army declared its completion in October 2005. The first vehicle rolled out in November 2006, with a price tag of 2.68 billion KRW. It was assigned to the 1st Artillery Brigade of the Republic of Korea Army. South Korea became the first nation to operate such type of military equipment.

The vehicle has a combat weight of 47 metric tons, and can support a K9 team by carrying and resupplying 104 shells of 155 mm artillery ammunition and 504 units of charges under heavy fire. The vehicle is operated by a 3-person crew, requiring only one loader by applying fully automated control system. It transfers ammunition at a maximum speed of 12 rounds/min. It takes 37 minutes to fully load, and 28 minutes to empty the K10. It is often called the briquette car by military and defense industry officials.

The K10 AARV (Armored Ammunition Resupply Vehicle) is an enhanced protection variant of the K10 ARV. The first of its kind will be produced in Australia as the AS10.

K11 FDCV (Fire Direction Control Vehicle)
The K11 FDCV is designed for the Egyptian military to provide command & control, reconnaissance, and communication for armored vehicles. The vehicle is based on K10, and has a high mobility.

Operational history
In October 2003, the K9 Thunder was evaluated by Spain at the military base located in Zaragoza.

In 2004, the K9 was sent to Malaysia to test its operation capability in tropical rainforest environment.

In 2004, KRCMI (Korea Research Center for Measuring Instruments) developed doppler radar calibration system, which gave significant increase in accuracy by lowering the impact error from 0.1% to 0.05%. Using the new technology, the ADD and DST (Davit System Technology) launched a joint project for a domestic MVRS (muzzle velocity radar system). In September 2007, DST announced the development of model MVRS-3000, increasing both performance and localization of the vehicle.

In December 2006, South Korean military distributed the K10 digital manual. The manual was developed with a budget of 1 billion KRW. It can easily identify the equipment composition, specifications, operation procedures, operating principles, maintenance tips, and signs of failure of the K10 ARV. It visualizes the vehicle in 3D virtual reality, so operators can easily understand compared to conventional text-based manuals. After seeing significant improvement in training efficiency, operating capability, and maintenance skill of soldiers, K9 digital manual was also adopted as a follow-up in May 2007.

In September 2010, a major issue regarding the engine was brought up by the defense committee. According to the report, a total of 38 K9s experienced engine cavitation since 2005. Initial investigation prior to the discussion suggested that the use of 3rd party manufactured antifreeze may have caused the engine cavitation. Using the recommended TK-6-03-01012 antifreeze did not solve the problem, suggesting that the antifreeze is not the cause of the issue. One of the defense committee mentioned that the Turkish T-155, which uses identical mobile system but has APU (auxiliary power unit) installed, never reported such a case. The military decided to go for further study by closely monitoring how antifreeze affects the engine, and test the APU when the vehicle is in idle. Installing an APU on the K9 was discussed during its development phase, but was not adapted for mass production.

The K9 Thunder saw its first combat during the bombardment of Yeonpyeong in November 2010. After receiving a surprise artillery bombardment from North Korea, howitzers operated by the 7th Artillery Company of the Republic of Korea Marine Corps were tasked with a counterattack. Prior to the attack, four howitzers had been on a scheduled firing exercise, and two remained in the fortified position. One vehicle experienced a shell stuck in the barrel due to a misfire from a faulty charge. After the training, the crew opened the hatches, and some dismounted while waiting for the disabled gun to be fixed.

Every vehicle always carries 20 shells of HE and flares combined for a rapid response. The marines on the island have been operating the AN/TPQ-37 radar since mid 2010 due to increasing threats from North Korea. However, the number of radar units was not sufficient to cover the long fortified North Korean coastline that marines were facing.

Three out of four vehicles participating in the exercise received damage from the initial surprise attack. Shrapnel from near-hit explosions damaged internal parts via open hatches, triggering a fire in one vehicle after hitting the charges stored inside. None of the vehicles suffered crew casualties. The attack disabled the main power station of the base, shutting off the radar temporarily. After relocating to a fortified position, the marines responded with three K9s, including one damaged vehicle, to predesignated positions at Mudo, as they were unable to locate North Korean artillery positions.

K9s were able to employ counter-battery fire after reactivated radar detected North Korean artillery positions at Kaemori, from a second wave of incoming attack. Another K9 joined the fight after switching to manual firing mode, increasing the number to four. Additional and different type of ammunitions were supplied by hand at the gun emplacements.

In May 2011, the K9 performed direct firing for the first time. A K9 is capable of hitting a bullseye at a distance of 1 km with direct firing.

In February 2012, the DAPA (Defense Acquisition Program Administration) launched arms localization project, which includes K9's INS. In May 2012, Doosan DST was selected for the domestic INS development. The plan to apply domestic INS on K9 was later changed to license produce in 2015 while domestic models are being used for K21 and K30.

In October 2013, Daeshin Metal became the major parts supplier for Allison Transmission in making X1100-5A3 as an offset trade, further increasing localization. Applicated transmission will be equipped starting on the 10th and the 5th batch production of K9 and K10 respectively.

In March 2015, South Korean military announced that Samsung Techwin is developing a driver's safety system, as a consequence of an accident resulting in the death of an operator in January 2015. Under the safety system, the turret rotation automatically stops if the driver's hatch remains open and is at the dangerous angle to the driver. The feature can be turned off if necessary.

In September 2015, another offset trade was signed between Honeywell Aerospace and Navcours. Under the agreement, Navcours will license production and service of the TALIN 5000 INS, which is already being used in the K9 and K55A1, for domestic use, and supply Honeywell Aerospace as well.

In May 2016, K9 test fired JBMoU (Joint Ballistics Memorandum of Understanding) compliant HE-ER ammunition in Sweden successfully, reaching 43 km in distance.

In August 2016, the K9 was tested by the UAE military. The vehicle managed to drive in the desert at max speed for one hour nonstop, without any malfunction.

In August 2017, a K9 operated by the 5th Artillery Brigade of the Republic of Korea Army was set ablaze during a firing exercise, causing 3 deaths and 4 wounds among crew members and instructors. After the investigation, it was found that the faulty spring caused the hammer to detonate prematurely, pushing the explosion into the vehicle before the breech was fully closed, and set on fire the additional charges which were taken out from the rack for the next firing. The entire K9 fleet operated by South Korea underwent inspection during the investigation. The Republic of Korea Armed Forces responded with the installation of black boxes, an AFSS (automatic fire suppression system), reinforced maintenance, and providing flame-resistance uniforms to crew members.

In May 2018, an ABC (Automatic Bore Cleaner) model RB-155 by SDI (SooSung Defense Industries) was adapted for the South Korean K9. The automatic cleaner provides efficiency in maintenance by requiring just one person to clean the barrel in 20 minutes, with incomparable result compared to conventional cleaning.

The production and the delivery of the K9 Thunder ended in June 2018. The factory will continue to produce the model as K9A1 variant. The first new variant was fielded by the 5th Artillery Brigade of the Republic of Korea Army in August 2018.

In November 2020, the DAPA announced that the entire K9 program delivered to the Republic of Korea Armed Forces is now at full operational capability, bringing the K9 Thunder program for the South Korean military to completion.

In May 2021, Hanwha Defense announced a cooperation with the Australian company HIFraser in supplying AFSS for AS9 and AS10 for Australia. HIFraser will start to assist Korean company DNB Co in delivery of AFSS to Korean operated K9s as well.

In May 2021, the K9 Vajra-T was deployed to the Ladakh region during territorial tensions between China and India.

In February 2022, Hanwha Defense signed a MOU with the Australian company Bisalloy Steel in supplying armor plate for the AS9, AS10, and AS21 Redback to reduce manufacturing cost and to strengthen their partnership. Hanwha Defense plans to use armor steel from Bisalloy Steel for foreign exports, including an Egyptian variant while POSCO continues supplying for domestic production.

The first K9 operators conference was held at Changwon in April 2022. Militaries from Australia, Estonia, Finland, Norway, and South Korea shared knowhow and feedback, while the defense industries looked for joint R&D for future upgrades and new weapon systems.

In September 2022, a K9A1 SPH and a K10 ARV demonstrated compatibility and live-fire with a variety of American munitions at Yuma Proving Ground in Arizona. The howitzer managed to fire 3 rounds in 16 seconds and 6 rounds in 43.3 seconds using the M795 projectiles. K9A1 became the first foreign platform to fire XM1113 RAP munition and achieved 53 km in shooting distance at an elevation of 900 mils.

Variants

K9A1
In September 2011, the Defense Committee addressed issues regarding the K9 Thunder's FCS (fire control system), noting that its computer and OS (operating system) are discontinued and outdated, thus increasing related logistics cost by 70% over past 3 years. India expressed the same concern. The first produced 24 K9s are equipped with i386 and the rest are with i486; DOS is installed on both types. On the other hand, Samsung Techwin argued that both the processor and the OS are widely used in the military including newly produced weapons, that older CPUs are more durable, and that DOS has a lower failure rate. 

The military was determined to launch a FCS upgrade program starting in 2013 for both logistical reason's and Australia's request. In October 2013, the DAPA announced a future plan for K9 upgrades along with a new extended range ammunition starting in 2014. In December 2013, the DAPA awarded Samsung Techwin as a main provider for the K9 upgrade program. In August 2014, Hanwha and Poongsan were selected as the preferred bidders for new extended ammunition used for both the K9 and the K55A1. The two companies will compete to win the project.

In August 2017, the DAPA approved the serial production of upgraded K9s. K9A1 upgrades include an automatic FCS, combining GPS system to INS, an improved driver's night periscope with thermal frontal camera, a rear view camera, and a driver's safety system. The 8~10 kW auxiliary power unit is provided by Farymann & TZEN co, Ltd. A1 standard also allows to shoot new extended range ammunition. Each vehicle will receive upgrades during its overhaul, starting in 2018. The first K9A1 joined the Republic of Korea Army in August 2018.

In July 2019, Hanwha was removed from the new ammunition project due to unsatisfactory results, making Poongsan the sole bidder. In November 2020, new extended range ammunition by Poongsan was accepted for service after years of tests. The new ammunition combines BB (base bleed) with RAP (rocket assisted propulsion), reaching 54 km with HE or 45 km with DP-ICM. The manufacturing will start in 2022, and will be operational by 2023. Poongsan has been working on different types of ammunitions, such as POM (PARA – Observation Munition) and GGAM (Gliding Guided Artillery Munition) since 2013 and 2014 respectively.

Details of the K9A1 upgrade:
 Installation of APU : The APU allows the vehicle to react and fire without running the main engine, thus reduces fuel consumption. Crew members can operate without being exposed to the engine noise. Since the engine no longer needs to operate when the vehicle is stationary, the cost for engine maintenance was reduced.
 Enhanced driver's system : The driver's night periscope was changed from image intensifier to FLIR, and can be viewed from the monitor. A rear view camera was installed. The driver's safety system disables the turret to rotate at a certain angle when the driver's hatch is open. The feature can be turned off if necessary.
 GPS : By combining INS and GPS, the vehicle can locate itself more precisely and faster by complementing each other, which also increases accuracy.
 Enhanced FCS : The computer and OS are upgraded. Software such as a field manual and ammunition monitoring are installed. The FCS is fully automated by using an electronic fuse setter and ammunition management system. The new FCS occupies less space, and is programmed for new extended range ammunition (54 km).

K9A2
In May 2016, the DAPA announced the concept for a robotic howitzer at the international artillery conference held in the United Kingdom. The DAPA then launched several projects consisting of insensitive charge, better rifling of the main gun, and a fully automated loading system. The upgraded K9 will have longer range, faster firing rates, and reduced crew members—similar capabilities to the United States' XM2001 Crusader.

In September 2020, the DAPA launched a project for indigenous engines for the vehicle. The project is expected to cost ₩75 billion over a period of 5 years. In May 2021, STX Engine was selected as the winner after competing against Doosan Infracore. STX Engine will receive a technology transfer and assistance from the British Ricardo plc in designing the new engine.

In August 2021, the ADD and Hanwha Defense completed the development of a high-response artillery automation system started in 2016. The new system is essential for a future remote controlled variant, and will enable a fully automated loading system including charges and fuse set—increasing the fire rate by 1.5 times. Developers originally designed munitions to be stored in the chassis. Due to the limited turret rotation, gun elevation, and to reduce the distance of munitions moving to the chamber for faster reloading, the location of the munitions was changed from the chassis to the turret.

The Republic of Korea Armed Forces will confirm the ROC for K9A2 Block-I upgrade in March 2022. The K9A2 is expected to be operational by 2027. The military is designing the K9A3, with a firing range of 100 km. The operational K9A2 technology demonstrator was revealed to the public by Hanwha Defense in February 2022. In March 2022, the high-response artillery automation system was shown to the public. The vehicle's turret is extended in length for installation of an autoloader. Its centre location is better than previous variants. The prototype weighs 48.5 t (combat) with metal tracks, which can be decreased by more than 2 t by switching to composite rubber tracks. Reduced weight can contribute to the installation of additional armor or subsystems.

In July 2022, the Defense Acquisition Program Promotion Committee approved 2.36 trillion KRW for 2023 to 2034 in development, and an upgrade of the K9A2 Block-I.

In September 2022 during DX Korea 2022, STX Engine presented a newly designed 1,000 hp diesel engine for the K9.

Details of the K9A2 upgrade:
 Enhanced main gun : New rifling and chrome plating will increase barrel life from 1,000 rounds to 1,500 rounds, longer range, and allow faster firing rate.
 High-response artillery automation system : Key feature of the A2 and future A3 upgrade. Reduces crew number from 5 to 3 (2 in emergency) by installing a fully automated autoloading system, which increases the firing rate from 6 to 8 rds/min to 9 to 10 rds/min.
 Increased sustained fire : All 48 rounds are located in the turret, and are accessible with the autoloader.
 Turret driving system : Changes from an electrohydraulic to an electric driving system.
 Automatic Fire Suppress System (AFSS) : Enhanced fire suppress system for crew protection.
 Remote controlled weapon station (RCWS) : Enables use of a secondary weapon without exposing a crew member.
 Air conditioning : Increases crew comfort by cooling down the temperature.
 Insensitive charge : Provides crew protection from secondary explosions due to enemy fire including heavy weapons, and required for the automatic loading process.
 Composite rubber track : Provides crew comfort by reducing vibration, noise, and lesser required maintenance. Reduced weight improves the vehicle's operational range. The rubber has a lower fatality from fragments to surrounding soldiers, compared to metal when under attack.
 Enhanced armor : Anti-tank mine protection. Similar to the AS9 Huntsman standard.

K9A3
In 2020, the DAPA announced the K9A3 upgrade plan will apply unmanned technology and achieve 100 km shooting distance using gliding ammunition. The DAPA talked about the development of a super long-range cannon and a railgun to be mounted on the next generation of self-propelled howitzers.

In September 2022, the ADD began research into increasing the firing range of the howitzer. The new variant is expected to equip a 58 caliber gun, similar to the US Army's M1299 howitzer and ramjet munitions to achieve a maximum range greater than 80 km. The project is scheduled to be 60 months long, completing in August 2027. In November 2022, the Defense Acquisition Program Promotion Committee approved 440 billion KRW between FY2024 to FY2036 to develop and acquire precision guided munitions for the K9 platform.

Exports

Turkey

In May 1999, the Ministry of National Defense of South Korea ordered its military attaché in Turkey to arrange a presentation for K9 Thunder. On 29 April, Samsung dispatched its sales team, and had a meeting with high-ranking Turkish officials including assistant secretary of defense and director of technology. Despite showing interest in K9 Thunder, there was no business deals made as Turkey was planning to produce German Panzerhaubitze 2000 at that time. Another meeting was held on 4 October between Atilla Ateş, commander of the Turkish Land Forces, and military attaché Colonel Go regarding K9 production in Turkey and solution for import restriction on MTU Friedrichshafen engines by German government. As Turkey's plan to build PzH2000 eventually became halted by Germany, South Korea and Turkey signed MOU to strengthen military and defense cooperation on 18 November.

On 12 December, Turkey sent a team of military general and engineers to Korea to inspect K9 Thunder. Satisfied with the performance, Turkey cancelled its plan to find replacement from Israel, and decided to manufacture K9 Thunder. On 19 February 2000, a technology evaluation team consisting members of the Agency of Defense Development and Samsung was sent to Turkey, and inspected various Turkish companies and facilities including Turkish 1010th Army Factory, MKEK, and Aselsan to optimize manufacturing process of K9 in Turkey. On 4 May 2000, the Ministry of National Defense of the Republic of Korea and Turkish Land Forces Command signed a memorandum of understanding (MOU) to supply 350 K9 systems till 2011.

On the same day the MOU was signed, Germany informed South Korea that Germany will not allow sales of license produced MTU engines to Turkey due to its political reasons, thus possibly cancelling the project. To solve the issue, Korea prepared for British Perkins Engines, which was already been examined for K9 during early designing phase, and negotiate with Germany in meantime. On 29 May 2000 during ministerial talks, South Korea asked Germany to permit sales of MTU engines, or it may experience hardship in purchasing German equipment for its future needs.

On 20 June, Turkey transferred $3.35 million to build a prototype, and engineers were sent to Samsung Techwin for technical training. Between July to August, parts for the prototype were built and sent to Turkey, and the engineers returned and assembled the vehicle with assistance from Korean counterparts. On 15 December, Germany approved Korea in exporting maximum of 400 engines to Turkey after reaching an agreement with license producing German Type 214 submarine as a winner of the KSS-II program for the Republic of Korea Navy. The prototype was finally equipped with engine, ending the assembly on 30 December 2000, and earned the nickname Fırtına (Storm).

Winter test was held in January and February 2001 at Sarıkamış, and Fırtına was able to operate in snowy mountain terrain without issue. It also went thru firing test in 10 to 23 of March at Karapinar, and summer test at Diyarbakır between April and May. On 12 May, Fırtına took a major part of firepower demonstration, showing its capabilities live on-air as it was needed for military to earn support from people and politicians to manufacture Fırtına amid economic crisis.

A formal contract was signed by Samsung Techwin (formerly Samsung Aerospace Industries) and the Embassy of the Republic of Turkey in Seoul on 20 July 2001. South Korean government will transfer the technologies belong to the Agency for Defense Development that are used for Turkish variant for free in exchange for Turkey to purchase 350 vehicles—280 for Turkish Land Forces and 70 for its future customer—by 2011, which the total is expected to be $1 billion. The first batch of 24 T-155 consists $65 million worth of Korean subsystems. The Turkish model was named T-155 Fırtına. Hanwha Defense has generated more than $600 million from Turkey since then, much lower than expectation from 2001 since Turkey only produced 280 units as well as its effort to increase localization gradually by indigenous research and from technology transfer.

Poland

In 1999, the same year Poland joined the NATO, it launched a military program named Regina Project to replace its Soviet-era SPGs with the NATO standard 155 mm artillery system. The British BAE Systems was chosen by Poland for technical cooperation to build a new design. Later, the plan was changed to use modified AS-90 turret and combine with UPG-NG chassis from domestic company Bumar to shorten the development schedule.

However, the UPG-NG chassis experienced series of issues during trial. The chassis was unable to support its 20 t turret by failing the shock absorption from 155 mm 52 caliber weapon system, often breaking and cracking the parts. In addition, the factory that has been producing S-12U engine for the vehicle was closed down, causing major discrepancy in logistics even before the mass production stage. In 2008, after four years since the prototype was revealed, Polish Ministry of Defense warned Bumar to fix the issue by 2014, otherwise it will look for foreign partner instead. Bumar failed to meet the ROC (required operational capability), thus K9 Thunder platform was chosen for the weapon project.

In December 2014, Samsung Techwin signed a cooperation agreement with Huta Stalowa Wola to supply K9 Thunder chassis for AHS Krab self-propelled howitzer. The deal is worth $310 million for 120 chassis, which includes related technology transfer and the power pack. From 2015 to 2022, 24 units will be manufactured in South Korea, and 96 will be license produced in Poland. First chassis rolled out on 26 June 2015, and all 24 vehicles produced in Korea left for Poland as of October 2016. HSW will begin producing K9 chassis starting in 2017.

Late in May 2022, the Polish government donated 18 AHS Krab howitzers to Ukraine to assist the Ukrainian military to defend against Russia during the invasion of Ukraine. On 29 May, Polish minister of defense visited South Korea for high level talks regarding the purchase of various Korean weapons including additional K9 chassis to increase AHS Krab production. On June 7, Poland and Ukraine signed a contract for the purchase of an additional 54 units plus support vehicles, in a deal worth US$700 million. The agreement was the largest defense contract that Polish defense industry had made.

On 27 July 2022, Polish Armaments Group (PGZ) and Hanwha Defense signed a framework agreement to supply 672 K9PL. Hanwha Defense hopes to expand the deal plus adding K10 ARV and K11 FDCV support vehicles. Poland will also produce AHS Krab in parallel; however, due to the low production capability, the deliveries of the existing order will be completed by 2026. On 26 August 2022, an executive contract of $2.4 billion was signed to acquire 212 K9A1s manufactured by Hanwha Defense as a first batch order. The deal does not include accompanying vehicles; however, it consists of crew training, including simulators, logistics packages, and a large amount of ammunition. To match the delivery time, the first 48 howitzers–12 upgraded vehicles and 36 to be refurbished to K9A1s–will be transferred from the Republic of Korea Army inventory. The ROKA will be compensated with newly produced vehicles by the end of 2023. All howitzers will be equipped with Polish communication system and Topaz Automated Fire Control Kit, which is intended for operating with Polish command vehicles. Delivery will commence between 2022 and 2026. Poland plans to build K9PL locally afterward via technology transfer for the second batch. On 7 September, Hanwha Defense and WB Electronics signed a $139.5 million deal for installation of Polish communication systems on the first batch order.

The first batch of 24 K9A1 was rolled out on 19 October 2022. The delivery ceremony was held in Poland on 6 December.

Finland

On 1 June 2016 at KDEC (Korea Defense Equipment & Component) industry fair, two nations signed a MOU for defense cooperation including export of used K9. In July 2016, the Finnish Ministry of Defence announced that an undisclosed number of used K9s have been selected to be acquired from the Republic of Korea. The acquisition is claimed to be biggest of the decade for the Land Forces, whose both mobile and towed artillery face mass outdating in the 2020s. In September 2016, K9 was field tested in Finland, and Seppo Toivonen, the commander of the Finnish Army, visited South Korea to inspect operating units during 2016 DX Korea. On 25 November 2016, two countries signed MOU to supply 48 used K9 for $200 million and match equal amount of free technology transfer related to vehicle maintenance.

On 17 February 2017, the Ministry of Defense announced that Finland will acquire 48 used K9s over a period of seven years starting in 2018, with conscript training on the equipment commencing in 2019. On 2 March 2017, final contract of value of €145 million ($160 million) was signed by two governments in Seoul, South Korea.

On 21 October 2021, Finnish Ministry of Defense authorized exercising option to purchase 10 additional units including spare parts and supplies—5 in 2021 and another 5 in 2022—for €30 million, increasing the fleet size to 58 vehicles.

On 18 November 2022 Finnish Minister of Defence Antti Kaikkonen authorized purchase of another 38 vehicles for €134 million.

The Finnish designation of the howitzer is K9FIN Moukari (Sledgehammer).

India

On 25 March 2012, South Korean president Lee Myung-bak and the Indian Prime Minister, Manmohan Singh signed MOU to strengthen the economy and military exchanges. On 29 March 2012 at DEFEXPO, Samsung Techwin and Larsen & Toubro announced their partnership to produce the K9 Thunder in India. As per the agreement, Samsung Techwin will transfer key technologies, and the vehicle will be manufactured under license in India using 50 per cent of the domestic content such as FCS and communication system.

Two units of K9 were sent to Thar Desert, Rajasthan for firing and mobility test, and competed against Russian 2S19. Operated by Indian military personnel, the K9 fired 587 Indian ammunitions including Nub round and drove a total distance of 1,000 km. Maintenance test was conducted at Pune, EMI (electromagnetic interference) test at Chennai, and technical environment test was held in Bengaluru until March 2014. K9 Thunder achieved all ROC set by Indian military while the Russian counterpart failed to do so. Hanwha Techwin (previously Samsung Techwin) later told in an interview that the Russian engine performance dropped when the air density is low and in high temperature, the placement of the engine also resulted in the center of the mass located at the rear, making the vehicle difficult to climb high angles. On the other hand, K9 benefitted from automatic control system of the engine, providing the optimum performance based on given condition automatically—this was one of the decisive reason why India selected K9 over 2S19.

In September 2015, the Indian Ministry of Defense (MoD) selected Hanwha Techwin and Larsen & Toubro as preferred bidder to supply 100 K9 Vajra-T to the Indian Army after K9 outperformed 2S19 Msta-S and passed two-year trial. On 6 July 2016, India agreed in purchasing 100 K9 Vajra-T for $750 million. On 29 March 2017, The Government of India approved budget of $646 million for purchasing 100 K9 Vajra-T. A formal contract of $310 million was signed between Hanwha Techwin and Larsen & Toubro in New Delhi on 21 April. Hanwha Techwin will supply first 10 K9 Vajra-T, and 90 will be license produced in India by Larsen & Toubro.

K9 Vajra-T consist 14 major Indian manufactured systems, 50% of component by value, which include Nub ammunition capable FCS and its storage, communication system, and environment control and NBC protection system. Additional systems were installed such as GPS (Gunner's Primary Sight) for direct firing capability, and South African APU, which was proven for desert operation—Korean APU was under development phase during Indian trial. The vehicle's overall design was modified to suitable for operation in desert and high temperature condition, including the change of firing rate to 3 rounds in 30 seconds.

In February 2020, media reported that IIT Madras along with IIT Kanpur, Armament Research and Development Establishment (ARDE) and Research Centre Imarat (RCI) are working on redesigning an existing 155 mm shell using ramjet propulsion that can cover 60 km+ range. It will be compatible with K9 Vajra-T. The shell will use precision guidance kit for trajectory correction. IIT Madras is ensuring that Munitions India can manufacture the shells.

The 100th vehicle was delivered to the Indian Army on 18 February 2021, completing the contract ahead the schedule.

In May 2021, it was reported that India's Defence Research and Development Organisation is working with Larsen & Toubro on a light tank using the K9 chassis with 105mm or 120mm gun system to counter China's Type 15 tank. The light tank variant was opted out as the estimated vehicle weight exceeded 30 t, limiting the places to operate.

The Indian Army planned ordering an additional 40 K-9 Vajra-T from Larsen & Toubro as of 2021 after completion of high altitude trials at Ladakh under cold climatic conditions. India is also looking to export the K9 Vajra-T variant to third countries in collaboration with South Korea and industry partners. After satisfactory performance at high altitude terrain, the MoD is getting ready to place repeat order of 200 K9 Vajra-T worth ₹9,600 crore. The proposal for first 100 units was cleared on 27 September 2022. The new batch will equip enhanced engine suited for high altitude operation, and is expected to complete delivery by 2028.

Norway
In May 2015, Samsung Techwin joined the Norwegian artillery upgrade program, competing against the KMW Panzerhaubitze 2000, the Nexter CAESAR 6x6, and the RUAG M109 KAWEST to replace Norway's M109Gs with 24 new systems. A single K9 was sent to Norway to join the competition. Operated by a sales team, the vehicle went through tests between November 2015 to January 2016. During the January winter test, the K9 was the only vehicle that managed to drive through meter-thick snow field and fire its weapon without any issue. Competing vehicles experienced engine troubles or broken parts.

The K9's engine was able to maintain heat overnight by simply covering the area with tarpaulin, a simple trick learned from operating experience, allowing the engine to ignite without failure the next day at an extremely cold temperature. The hydropneumatic suspension became a huge advantage for mobility, as its mechanism melted snow on mobility parts much quicker. The test result also impacted Finland and Estonia, who were invited to observe performances for their artillery replacement, to acquire the K9.

In August 2016, the Norwegian Defence Materiel Agency published their intention to continue negotiations with Hanwha Techwin and RUAG, while Krauss-Maffei Wegmann and Nexter Systems had been put "on hold". Unnamed sources in the Norwegian Army had previously stated that the K9 was a leading candidate in the competition.

In December 2017, a contract of $230 million was signed between Hanwha Land Systems and the Norwegian Ministry of Defense, for supplying 24 K9 Thunder and 6 K10 ARV by 2020. The K9 outperformed competitors in various weather and terrain conditions according to Norwegian military officials during trials.

The Norwegian variant was named K9 VIDAR (Versatile InDirect ARtillery system), and is based on the K9A1 configuration. It differs from the K9A1 by changing the BTCS to a Norwegian ODIN fire support system and radio communication systems for NATO operation. It mounts the gunner's sight for direct firing, and installed spall liner for additional protection. Norwegian company Kongsberg participated in upgrading the K9 for Norway, Finland, and Estonia. The company will partner with Hanwha Defense again for Australia's AS9 program.

In November 2022, Norway used an option signed in 2017, to purchase 4 K9s and 8 K10s, increasing its total vehicles to 28 K9s and 14 K10s (2:1 ratio). The delivery is expected to be completed in 2 years.

Estonia
Estonia was invited by Finland in teaming up for the procurement of the K9, to reduce the purchase cost for both nations. Benefitted by group buying, the test data of the K9 was provided and shared to Estonia by Finland, with approval from South Korea. In February 2017, Estonian military officials visited South Korea for a price negotiation. Estonia is expected to purchase 12 K9s for $50 million.

In June 2018, Rauno Sirk, the director of the Estonian military procurement agency, announced that Estonia will buy K9 Thunder howitzers. Hanwha Land Systems will supply 12 used K9s, including maintenance parts and training for €46 million, a similar contract to that of Finland. In October 2019, the Estonian Ministry of Defense announced that it will exercise the option to purchase 6 additional K9s from the previous contract, with an estimated value of €20 million.

In August 2021, the Estonian Centre for Defense Investment (RKIK) signed €4.6 million contract with Hanwha Defense and Go Craft in modernizing 24 K9EST Kõu, hinting at purchasing 6 more for its inventory. The upgrade involves communication systems, a FCS, painting, fire suppression system, and electronics.

In September 2022, it was reported that Estonia has purchased 24 vehicles in total. In October, the Estonian defense minister stated that Estonia will procure 12 additional K9s, bringing the total number up to 36 units. In November 2022, Go Craft opened Estonia's first private military workshop, and will start upgrading K9s.

Australia
In June 2005 in Australia, the defense ministers of the two nations held a meeting and discussed trading opportunities involving K9 Thunder and Australian 5 inch naval gun ammunition. In August 2009, it was reported that the consortium of Samsung Techwin and Raytheon Australia had the upper hand for Australia's Land 17 artillery replacement program by becoming a sole bidder, as KMW, the manufacturer of Panzerhaubitze 2000, did not respond in providing detailed offering proposal that Australia requested.

The K9 was sent to Australia, and was evaluated by the Australian military starting in April 2010. The test included firing M982 Excalibur, a requirement which the K9 satisfied. The Australian variant AS9 was expected to feature the NATO standard FCS, the BMS-F (Battlefield Management System – Fires), the RWS (Remote Weapon System), and anti-tank mine protection. The hydropneumatic suspension was enhanced to support its increased weight.

In June 2010, the K9 became the preferred bidder for the LAND 17 program. The project budget was redirected for restoration due to the floods in Queensland in 2011, which led to the cancelation of the project in May 2012. In May 2019, in the lead-up to the 2019 Federal Election, the Prime Minister of Australia, Scott Morrison, announced that 30 K9 howitzers and associated support equipment, including ten K10 ammunition resupply vehicles, would be acquired for the ADF. No time frame was given for the purchase.

In September 2020, the Minister for Defense, Linda Reynolds, announced a request for tender to locally build 30 K9s under the Land 8116 Phase 1 Protected Mobility Fires requirement. The sole-source request for tender will be released to the preferred supplier, Hanwha Defense Australia, to build and maintain 30 K9s and 15 K10s, as well as their supporting systems. These will be built at Hanwha Defense Australia's Geelong facility. Australian variant AS9 Huntsman is based on Norwegian K9 VIDAR. It will retain the options offered in 2010 with up-to-date modifications.

In December 2021, the Capability Acquisition and Sustainment Group (CASG) of Australia and Hanwha Defense Australia signed a formal contract of producing 30 AS9s and 15 AS10 AARVs under license at Hanwha Defense Australia facility in Geelong, Victoria; the facility, which is included in the contract, will begin its construction in Q2 2022. The CASG and the DAPA also signed an MOU for defense cooperation between the two countries. The estimated value of the deal is $788 million, and manufacturing is expected to start in Q4 2024.

In February 2022, Hanwha Defense Australia made a selection of site of 150,000 m2, which includes 32,000 m2 manufacturing facility, 1.5 km long track, and various test and R&D sites, for its first overseas factory named H-ACE (Hanwha Armoured Vehicle Centre of Excellence) at Geelong, which will create 300 jobs for local specialists. Construction began on 8 April, and is expected to take 2 years to complete.

In March 2022, Hanwha Defense signed a $67 million deal with Kongsberg for the installation of C4 for Australian vehicles. The Norwegian partner is expected to supply Integrated Combat Solution (ICS) as well as ODIN fire support systems via Kongsberg Australia. On 19 July, Hanwha Systems signed a contract with Hanwha Defense Australia to supply HUMS (Health and Usage Monitoring System) and Situational Awareness System (SAS) for AS9s and AS10s at a cost of 20.8 billion KRW.

Egypt
In 2010, the K9 was evaluated by Egyptian military to replace its aging artillery fleet. The deal was delayed as Egyptian government requested a reduction on technology transfer fees, of which the Korean government had the ownership, not the company. The negotiation stopped as regional instability due to the Arab Spring caused the Egyptian government to postpone the project indefinitely.

In April 2017, it was reported that Hanwha Techwin was in negotiations with Egypt to export its K9 Thunder self-propelled howitzer. A K9 howitzer was sent to Egypt in July, and performed test-firing at a range located west of Cairo in August, along with other competitors including French CAESAR, Russian 2S35 Koalitsiya-SV, and Chinese PLZ-45. During the test, the K9 hit a target ship approaching to the shore, successfully performing an anti-access/area denial simulation against enemy ships for the Egyptian Navy.

In October 2021, the two nations discussed the sale of the K9 Thunder. The estimated value of the deal is $2 billion, including training of technicians. In the same month, the Egyptian minister of military production visited Hanwha Defense and Hyundai WIA facility to see the manufacturing process of the K9 Thunder and K2 Black Panther respectively. Two parties met again at the EDEX 2021, including the President Abdel Fattah el-Sisi for discussion of the export of the howitzer. Egypt is looking to produce the howitzer under license.

In February 2022, the Defense Acquisition Program Administration announced that Hanwha Defense signed a $1.6 billion K9 Thunder export contract at Egypt's Artillery House, attended by Egypt's Ministry of National Defense and key officials from both countries. The deal includes the production of unspecified numbers of K9A1EGY, K10, and K11 FDCV in Egypt, including technology transfer, according to the Defense Acquisition Program Administration (DAPA). An unknown quantity of early productions will be produced in South Korea and delivered to the Egyptian Army and the Egyptian Navy. On 25 February, two more contracts involving parts purchase and assembly were signed at the Military Factory 200, a state-owned Egyptian arms manufacturer.

The production of the first K9A1EGY is expected in Q4 2022, with armor steel provided from Bisalloy Steel. The first batch will be delivered to Egypt until 2024, while the rest will be produced in Egypt with a localization rate of 50%. Egypt is expecting to increase localization to 67% in five years. On 22 October 2022, Hanwha Defense signed a contract with Arab International Optronics in transferring automatic fire control system (AFCS) and other substantial technologies.

Ongoing sales

United Kingdom
In September 2021, Hanwha Defense launched Team Thunder joined by Leonardo UK (navigation, FCS, electronics), Pearson Engineering (manufacturing), Horstman (suspension), and Soucy Defense (track) to participate in the Mobile Fires Platform (MFP) program, starting in late 2023 to replace Britain's AS90 with a K9A2 variant. The team expanded as Lockheed Martin UK (turret & autoloader) joined Team Thunder in March 2022. The K9A2 was first revealed in the United Kingdom during Defense Vehicle Dynamics 2022 at UTAC Millbrook Proving Ground in September 2022.

Romania
On 23 September 2022, Romanian Minister of National Defense Vasile Dincu visited South Korea and signed a letter of intent to strengthen defense cooperation. On 26, Romanian media reported that the military is interested in purchasing K9 Thunder and K2 Black Panther. Besides the K9 howitzers, Romania is also interested in K239 Chunmoo multiple rocket launchers and K21 infantry fighting vehicles. On 6 February 2023, a memorandum of understanding was also signed between Hanwha Aerospace and Romarm for the local production of powders, explosives and other ground military systems.

Failed bids

Denmark
The K9 Thunder participated in a bid against Nexter's CAESAR 8x8 and Soltam Systems ATMOS 2000. In March 2017, the Danish military announced it had selected the competing CAESAR 8x8 instead.

Variants and upgrades
 XK9: Experimental prototype. 2 built.
 K9 Thunder: First-production variant.
 T-155 Fırtına: Turkish self-propelled howitzer based on the K9. Manufactured and assembled by Turkish Land Forces using subsystems imported from South Korea. Turret is modified to store additional ammunition, but increasing combat weight in return. The vehicle has APU installed, but lacks commander's panoramic sight.
 AS9 "Aussie Thunder": Offered Australian variant of the K9 in 2010. It featured enhanced FCS, BMS-F, RWS, and anti-tank mine protection capability. The suspension is also upgraded to support increased weight.
 AHS Krab: Polish self-propelled howitzer, uses the K9 chassis and power pack. Chassis is license produced by Huta Stalowa Wola.
 K9 PIP: K9 upgrade plan noticeably adding APU, upgraded FCS. The upgrade later evolved into K9A1 with additional modifications.
 K9 Vajra-T (Lightning): Indian variant of the K9. Manufactured by Larsen & Toubro under license. It is customized for desert and alpine operations, and equips Safran MINEO DFSS for direct firing.
 K9FIN Moukari (Sledge-hammer): Finnish variant of the K9. Formerly used by the Republic of Korea Armed Forces, and refurbished with upgrades.
 K9EST Kõu (Thunder): Estonian variant of the K9. Formerly used by the Republic of Korea Armed Forces, and refurbished with upgrades.
 K9A1: First enhanced variant for the Republic of Korea Armed Forces. First K9A1 rolled out and is in service of the Republic of Korea Army since 2018. All K-9 operated by the ROK Armed Forces will be upgraded to A1 or future variant by 2030.
 K9 VIDAR (Versatile InDirect ARtillery system): Norwegian variant of the K9A1 with Norwegian subsystems and better protection. Uses Safran MINEO DFSS for direct firing.
 AS9 Huntsman: Australian variant of the K9. Its an upgraded version of K9 VIDAR standard with additional armor package and enhanced suspension. New hull design is similar to AS21 Redback in appearance.
 K9A1EGY: Egyptian variant of K9A1. Will be produced under license in Egypt.
 K9PL(A1): Polish variant of K9A1. Equipped with TOPAZ FCS.
 K9A2: Second enhanced variant for the Republic of Korea Armed Forces. 1 prototype built and shown to the public in 2022, and is in development. Also known as K9A2 Block-I to differentiate from 58 caliber variant.
 K9PL(A2): Licensed variant of the K9A2 for the Polish Land Forces.
 K9A2 Block-II: 155 mm 58 caliber variant of K9A2. Proposal stage only.
 K9A3: Fully automated and unmanned K9A2. Under development.
 K10 ARV (Ammunition Resupply Vehicle): Automatic resupplying vehicle for K9 Thunder using the same chassis.
 K10 VIDAR (Versatile InDirect ARtillery system): Norwegian variant of the K10.
 K10 AARV (Armored Ammunition Resupply Vehicle): Enhanced protection variant of K10 ARV.
 AS10: Australian variant of the K10 AARV. Similar configuration to AS9.
 AS10C2: Suggested protected Command & Control Post variant based on AS10.
 K11 FDCV (Fire Direction Control Vehicle): Fire direction control vehicle based on K10.

Operators

 — Factory under construction.
 Australia will build 30 AS9 Huntsman self-propelled howitzers and 15 AS10 AARVs under license at Geelong.

 — In finalization for production and technology transfer.
 Egypt placed an order for undisclosed amount of K9A1EGY, K10, and K11 in February 2022. Production starts in 2022 Q4 at Hanwha Defense in South Korea.

 — 18 K9EST Kõu in service in the Estonian Land Forces. 6 vehicles in production and 12 more planned.
 Estonia placed an order for 12 used K9 with an option for 12 additional systems in June 2018. Estonia exercised an option for 6 additional howitzers in October 2019. Deliveries began in 2020. Estonia received a total of 18 vehicles as of 10 December 2022.

 — 58 K9FIN Moukari in service in the Finnish Army. 38 vehicles on order.
 Finland placed an order for 48 used K9s with an option for 48 additional systems in March 2017. 10 additional units were ordered in 2021 and 2022. 38 more ordered in 2022, using full option contract signed in 2017.

 — 100 K9 Vajra-T in service in the Indian Army. 100 vehicles in production.
 10 K9 Vajra-Ts were bought from South Korea and assembled by Larsen & Toubro in India, and were handed to the Indian Army in 2018. Remaining 90 vehicles were produced by Larsen & Toubro, and all were delivered by February 2021. India placed a second order for 100 vehicles in September 2022.

 — 24 K9 VIDAR and 6 K10 VIDAR in service in the Norwegian Army. 4 K9 and 8 K10 on order.
 Norway initially placed an order for 24 K9 VIDARs and 6 K10 VIDARs, to replace the M109A3GNM, with an option for another 24 K9 and additional K10. First deliveries took place in 2019. Another 4 K9 and 8 K10 were ordered in November 2022.

 — At least 80 K9 chassis produced for AHS Krab in service in the Polish Land Forces. 24 K9PL(A1) produced and delivered, 188 in production.
 120 K9 chassis will be produced as part of the AHS Krab program. 24 were built in Korea, and 96 are produced under license in Poland.
 Poland ordered 212 K9A1 in August 2022. Delivery will commence between 2022 and 2026.
 460 K9PL(A2) howitzers will be produced in Poland under license from 2026. 
 — An estimated 1,300 K9/K9A1 and 450 K10 are in service in the Republic of Korea Army and the Republic of Korea Marine Corps.
 An estimated 1,300 K9s (1998–2017, Batch 1–10) and K9A1s (2017–2019, Batch 11) were produced. An estimated more than 450 K10s (2006–2019, Batch 1–6) were produced for the Army and the Marine Corps. In November 2020, all vehicles were in full operational capability. All K9 are in the process of upgrading to K9A1 or a future variant by 2030.

 — 280 T-155 Fırtına in service in the Turkish Land Forces.
 The Turkish Land Forces produced 280 T-155 Fırtına. Turkey originally sought to manufacture 350 (280 for domestic use and 70 for exports) by 2011. Germany's veto on export of Korean licensed MTU engines via Turkey prevented the export of T-155 as well.

Related developments 
 T-155 Fırtına
 AHS Krab

Notes

References

External links

 K9 Thunder Self-propelled Howitzer – Artillery Systems – Hanwha Defense
 Global Security on K-9 Howitzer
 Defense News

Self-propelled artillery of South Korea
155 mm artillery
Tracked self-propelled howitzers
Self-propelled howitzers
Military vehicles introduced in the 1990s